Sanyutei may refer to:

San'yūtei Enchō (1839–1900)
San'yūtei Enraku V (1932–2009)
San'yūtei Enraku VI (born 1950)

Rakugoka